Birgitta "Gittan" Törn (born 11 June 1948) is a Swedish curler.

In 1980 she was inducted into the Swedish Curling Hall of Fame.

Teams

Women's

Mixed

References

External links
 

Living people
1948 births
Swedish female curlers
World curling champions
Swedish curling champions